Purvi Champaran Lok Sabha constituency is one of the 40 Lok Sabha (parliamentary) constituencies in Bihar state in eastern India. This constituency came into existence in 2008 as a part of the implementation of delimitation of parliamentary constituencies based on the recommendations of the Delimitation Commission of India constituted in 2002.

Assembly segments
Presently, Purvi Champaran Lok Sabha constituency comprises the following six Vidhan Sabha (legislative assembly) segments:

Members of Parliament

Election results

See also
 East Champaran district
 List of Constituencies of the Lok Sabha

External links
Purvi Champaran lok sabha  constituency election 2019 result details

Lok Sabha constituencies in Bihar
Politics of East Champaran district